Nestor's cup, the Cup of Nestor or the Nestor Cup may refer to:

 Nestor's Cup (mythology), legendary golden cup owned by the mythical hero Nestor and described in Book 11 of the Iliad
 Nestor's Cup (Mycenae), golden cup discovered in a shaft grave at Mycenae, so named for its similarities to the cup described in the Iliad
 Nestor's Cup (Pithekoussai), clay cup discovered at Pithekoussai, Italy, which has an inscription referring to the legendary cup
 The Nestor Cup, a Gaelic football trophy awarded annually to the winner of the Connacht Senior Football Championship